The Älterer Schlier Formation is a geologic formation in Austria. It preserves fossils dated to the Aquitanian age of the Miocene period.

Fossil content 
The formation has provided fossils of:
 Petralca austriaca

See also 
 List of fossiliferous stratigraphic units in Austria

References

Bibliography 

 

Geologic formations of Austria
Miocene Series of Europe
Neogene Austria
Aquitanian (stage)
Paleontology in Austria